Amastris (killed c. 284 BC) also called Amastrine, was a Persian princess, and Tyrant-ruler of the city of Heraclea from circa 300 to her death. She was the daughter of Oxyathres, the brother of the Persian King Darius III.

Life
Amastris was given by Alexander the Great in marriage to Craterus, however Craterus later decided to marry Phila, one of the daughters of Antipater.  Still, he first arranged his wife's advantageous marriage to Dionysius, tyrant of Heraclea Pontica, in Bithynia, whom she married in 322 BC. She had two sons with him named Clearchus and Oxyathres.

 

After the death of Dionysius in 305, Amastris became guardian of their children and queen of Heraclea. Several others joined in this administration. Amastris married Lysimachus in 302.  However, he divorced her after the Battle of Ipsus in 301 BC and married Arsinoe II, one of the daughters of Ptolemy I Soter, the first Pharaoh of Ptolemaic Egypt.  

After her marriage to Lysimachus ended, Amastris retired to Heraclea, which she governed as tyrant in her own right. She also founded shortly after 300 a city called after her own name Amastris, on the sea-coast of Paphlagonia, by the fusion (synoecism) of the four smaller towns of Sesamus, Cromna, Cytorus and Tium. Tium later regained its autonomy, but the other three remained part of the city of Amastris' territory. 

She was drowned by her two sons about 284 but the matricide was avenged by Lysimachus, who made himself master of Heraclea, and put both Clearchus and Oxyathres to death.

References

Sources

External links
Ulrich Wilcken: Amastris 7. In: Paulys Realencyclopädie der classischen Altertumswissenschaft (RE). Vol. I,2, Stuttgart 1894, szpalta 1750.

4th-century BC women rulers
3rd-century BC women rulers
People associated with Alexander the Great
Achaemenid princesses
Deaths by drowning
Year of birth unknown
Murdered royalty
4th-century BC Iranian people
280s BC deaths
Heraclea Pontica
Ancient Greek tyrants